Karol Hoffmann (born 1 June 1989) is a Polish triple jumper. He won a silver medal at the 2016 European Athletics Championships and placed 12th at the 2016 Olympics.

Hoffmann's father Zdzisław won the 1983 world title in the triple jump and still holds the Polish national record. Karol has a tattoo of that record on his leg. He first played football, but at the age of 10 had a bad hit to his nose. Doctors advised him to avoid any further nose injuries, so he changed to athletics.

Competition record

References

1989 births
Living people
Athletes from Warsaw
Polish male triple jumpers
European Athletics Championships medalists
Athletes (track and field) at the 2016 Summer Olympics
Olympic athletes of Poland
Olympic male triple jumpers
European Games competitors for Poland
Athletes (track and field) at the 2019 European Games